Nyeri County is a county located in the central region of Kenya. Its capital and largest town is Nyeri. It has a population of 759,164 and an area of 2361 km2. It is currently under the leadership of H.E. Governor Mutahi Kahiga. Other governors who have led this county include Nderitu Gachagua, who passed while receiving treatment in London, Wamathai Samuel Githaiga, and Wahome Gakuru, who died in a road accident at Kabati near Kenol heading towards Thika Super Highway.

People
The county is located on the southwest flank of Mount Kenya. Local people are predominantly of the Kikuyu ethnicity.

Local authorities

LOCAL GOVERNMENT

In reference to the 2022 general elections, the 3rd County  Assembly was successfully formed. Its members are as follows:

Speaker - Hon. James Gichuhi Mwangi

Deputy Speaker - Hon. Samuel Kariuki Gichuki,  MCA Ruring'u Ward

Majority Leader - Hon. James Kanyugo Mwangi, MCA Mahiga Ward

Majority Whip -  Hon. Sabastian Mugo Theuri,Majority Whip, MCA Wamagana Ward 

     
Elected MCAs

Nominated MCAs

Administrative divisions

Constituencies
The county has six constituencies: 
Tetu Constituency
Kieni Constituency
Mathira Constituency
Othaya Constituency
Mukurweini Constituency
Nyeri Town Constituency

Central Kenya Region

Urbanisation
 Source: OpenDataKenya

Wealth/poverty level
 Source: OpenDataKenya Worldbank

Education
Kenyatta High School (Mahiga)

See also
Morris Gachamba
Gathukimundu
Gathuthi
Kiawaithanji
Munyange

References

 
Counties of Kenya
Mount Kenya